María José Pizarro Rodríguez (born 30 March 1978) is a Colombian artist, activist, and politician. She was a member of the country's Chamber of Representatives from 2018 to 2022, and has been a senator for the Historic Pact since July 2022.

Biography
María José Pizarro was born in Bogotá on 30 March 1978, the daughter of Myriam Rodríguez and the former guerrilla and leader of the 19th of April Movement, Carlos Pizarro Leongómez.

During her childhood, she had to live in exile in Ecuador, Nicaragua, and France. She returned to Colombia when her father was a candidate in the 1990 presidential election, and went back into exile after he was assassinated. In 2002, she settled in Spain, studied design in Barcelona, and returned definitively to her home country in 2010.

A plastic artist who works in jewelry and audiovisual presentations, she held an exhibition at the Colombian National Museum titled Ya vuelvo: Carlos Pizarro, una vida por la paz (I'm Back: Carlos Pizarro, A Life for Peace). It was presented in Bogotá, Cali, and Barcelona.

She worked with the Secretariat of Culture, Recreation, and Sports of Bogotá from 2011 to 2013, and the National Center for Historical Memory from 2013 to 2017. She has also been an activist for peace and historical memory, in homage to the victims of the armed conflict in Colombia. She has dedicated much of her work to reconstructing the memory of her father. She compiled his letters and photographs in the 2015 book De su puño y letra.

Political career

She obtained the fourth highest number of votes, with 78,000. She was sworn in on 20 July of the same year.

She ran for senator in the 2022 parliamentary election, for the Historic Pact coalition in a  party quota. She was elected, and took office on 20 July.

On 7 August 2022, in her capacity as a senator, she placed the presidential sash on Gustavo Petro at his inauguration.

Works
 De su puño y letra (2015), Penguin Random House Grupo Editorial Colombia, 
  Pizarro documental (2015), with Simón Hernández, produced by Señal Colombia

References

External links

 
 María José Pizarro Rodríguez at the Chamber of Representatives 
  

1978 births
21st-century Colombian politicians
21st-century Colombian women artists
21st-century Colombian women politicians
Living people
Members of the Chamber of Representatives of Colombia
Members of the Senate of Colombia
Politicians from Bogotá